Edzcom Oy (formerly Ukkoverkot and Ukko Mobile until 30 March 2020) is the Nordic integrator of Edge Connectivity. 

In July 2020, Edzcom was acquired by Cellnex Telecom, continue to provide and operate private network to enterprise customers. Since then, Edzcom has extended to UK's and French market, and will develop across Europe as a Cellnex company . Until January 2022, Edzcom has brought 40 implementations of private network for many enterprises such as Kalmar, Finavia, Steveco, Kone, etc.

See also
 Net 1
Cellnex Telecom

References

Internet service providers of Finland
Mobile phone companies of Finland